Term neuropsin may refer to:

 Kallikrein 8, an enzyme class
 OPN5, a protein that in humans is encoded by the OPN5 gene